This is a list of Otidiformes species by global population. While numbers are estimates, they have been made by the experts in their fields. For more information on how these estimates were ascertained, see Wikipedia's articles on population biology and population ecology. This list is not comprehensive, as not all species have had their global populations estimated.

Species by global population

References 

Otidiformes